ENUM or enum may refer to:

 E.164 Number Mapping, a suite of protocols to unify the telephone system with the Internet
 An enumerated type, a data type consisting of a set of named values